Bineshwar Prasad (born 18 July 1963) is a Fijian long-distance runner. He competed in the men's marathon at the 1988 Summer Olympics and the 1992 Summer Olympics.

References

External links

1963 births
Living people
Athletes (track and field) at the 1988 Summer Olympics
Athletes (track and field) at the 1992 Summer Olympics
Fijian male long-distance runners
Fijian male marathon runners
Olympic athletes of Fiji
Athletes (track and field) at the 1982 Commonwealth Games
Athletes (track and field) at the 1986 Commonwealth Games
Commonwealth Games competitors for Fiji
Place of birth missing (living people)